The 2009 Ford Ironman World Championship was held on October 10, 2009 in Kailua-Kona, Hawaii. It was the 33rd such Ironman Triathlon World Championship, which has been held annually in Hawaii since 1978. The champions were Craig Alexander and Chrissie Wellington. The championship was organised by the World Triathlon Corporation (WTC).

Race highlights
A total of 1,778 athletes from more than 48 countries started the race and 1,653 (1,200 men and 453 women) finished, 3 were disqualified.  Hot and humid weather conditions prevailed with temperatures well above 90 °F (32.2 °C) during the bike and run portions.

Both Chrissie Wellington (3rd consecutive win) and Craig Alexander (2nd consecutive win) continue their current reigns as Ironman World Champions.

Chrissie Wellington set a new women's course record of 8:54:02, breaking Paula Newby-Fraser's 17-year-old women's course record.  She finished 22nd overall among the pro men and women.

Mirinda Carfrae set a new women's course run record of 2:56:51 in her very first Ironman World Championship, breaking the women's course run record that Chrissie Wellington set one year ago.

Medallists

Men

Women

Qualification

To enter for the 2009 World Championship race, athletes were required to qualify through performance at an Ironman or selected Ironman 70.3 race, through Hawaii residency, through a random allocation lottery, or by invitation from the WTC.

The Ironman 2009 Series consisted of 21 Ironman qualifying races plus the Ironman World Championship 2008 which was itself a qualifier for the 2010 Ironman World Championship. The series started with Ironman Wisconsin 2008 held on September 7, 2008, and in total 1,800 athletes qualified for the World Championship race.

Qualifying Ironmans 

The fastest time of 7:59:16 was set by Timo Bracht during the Ironman European Championship 2009 at Frankfurt, Germany.

2009 Ironman Series results

Men

Women

References

External links
Kona 2009 » IRONMAN.com (Event homepage)

Ironman World Championship
Ironman
Sports competitions in Hawaii
2009 in sports in Hawaii
Triathlon competitions in the United States